Melissa Hardy (born 1969) is an American politician serving as a member of the Nevada Assembly from the 22nd district.

Early life and education
Hardy was born in 1969 in Las Vegas, Nevada. After attending Las Vegas High School, Hardy earned a B.S. in hotel and business administration from the University of Nevada, Las Vegas.

Career
Hardy worked as a real estate agent from 1993 to 2007. Hardy is a member of the Henderson Chamber of Commerce. In 2018, Hardy was elected to the Nevada Assembly, where she has been representing the 22nd district since November 7, 2018.

Personal life
Melissa Hardy is married to David S. Hardy. They have two children.

References

Living people
1969 births
Politicians from Las Vegas
University of Nevada, Las Vegas alumni
Republican Party members of the Nevada Assembly
Women state legislators in Nevada
21st-century American politicians
21st-century American women politicians